Anatoly Ivanovich Kolesov (18 January 1938 – 2 January 2012) was a Soviet Greco-Roman wrestler and coach. He won the world welterweight title in 1962, 1963 and 1965 and an Olympic gold medal in 1964.

Kolesov won only two Soviet titles, in 1959 and 1964. He retired in 1965, and in 1966–69 was the head coach of the Soviet national wrestling team. From 1969 to 1992 he served as deputy chairman of the Committee for Physical Culture and Sport with the Council of Soviet Ministers. He headed the Soviet Wrestling Federation in 1991, and the Soviet and then Russian wrestling teams at the 1972–2004 Olympics.

References

External links

1938 births
2012 deaths
People from Karaganda Region
Communist Party of the Soviet Union members
Medalists at the 1964 Summer Olympics
Olympic gold medalists for the Soviet Union
Olympic wrestlers of the Soviet Union
World Wrestling Championships medalists
Wrestlers at the 1964 Summer Olympics
Honoured Masters of Sport of the USSR
Recipients of the Order "For Merit to the Fatherland", 3rd class
Recipients of the Order "For Merit to the Fatherland", 4th class
Recipients of the Order of Friendship of Peoples
Recipients of the Order of the Red Banner of Labour
Russian male sport wrestlers
Soviet male sport wrestlers
Burials in Troyekurovskoye Cemetery